The Women's China Squash Open 2016 is the women's edition of the 2016 China Squash Open, which is a tournament of the PSA World Tour event International (prize money: 70 000 $). The event took place in Shanghai in China from 1 to 4 September. Laura Massaro won her first China Squash Open trophy, beating Nouran Gohar in the final.

Prize money and ranking points
For 2016, the prize purse was $70,000. The prize money and points breakdown is as follows:

Seeds

Draw and results

See also
2016 PSA World Tour
China Squash Open
Men's China Squash Open 2016

References

External links
PSA China Squash Open 2016 website
China Squash Open 2016 SquashSite website

Squash tournaments in China
China Squash Open
Squash Open
2016 in women's squash
Sports competitions in Shanghai